Doliani is a village and a community of the Zagori municipality in Ioannina Regional Unit, Greece. Before the 2011 local government reform it was part of the municipality of East Zagori, of which it was a municipal district. The 2011 census recorded 55 inhabitants in the village. The community of Doliani covers an area of 17.276 km2. Doliani is a traditional Aromanian (Vlach) settlement.

See also
 List of settlements in the Ioannina regional unit

References

Populated places in Ioannina (regional unit)
Aromanian settlements in Greece